A meyhane (from Persian: میخانه translit. meykhaneh) is a traditional restaurant or bar in Turkey and rest of the Balkans, Azerbaijan and Iran. It serves alcoholic beverages like wine, rakı, vodka, beer with meze and traditional foods. "Meyhane" means house of wine and is composed of two Persian words: mey (wine) and khāneh (house). The word entered the Serbian and Bulgarian languages as mehana (механа, plural in Bulgarian механи) and in Macedonian as meana (меана, plural меани). In Bosnian language the word "mejhana" is used. A meyhane used to serve mainly wine alongside meze until the late 19th century when rakia established itself as the quasi-official national drink of Bulgaria. In Serbia, the word mehana is considered archaic, while in Bulgaria it refers to a restaurant with traditional food, decoration and music.

Meyhane in Turkey 
History of the meyhane dates before Ottomans in region. Despite meyhanes did not only exist in Istanbul but whole Turkey, most of the knowledge remaining to date belongs to there.

In the 17th century the restaurants of what is now the Bosphorus used to be in Haliç. In these meyhane janissary clients were called Dayi and everyone respected them. While the janissaries were in the meyhane, corner boys (baldırı çıplak) and vagabonds (külhanbeyleri) couldn't enter. Even if they entered, there weren't allowed the same behavior as janissaries and they could only drink while standing. These type of meyhane were called “Gedikli Meyhaneler”. After Abdülaziz, their name changed to “Selatin Meyhaneler”

Another type of meyhane was called “Koltuk Meyhanesi”. These were for vagabonds and corner boys. These meyhane were illegal. They were selling alcohol surreptitiously in grocery stores. Some of these “Koltuk Meyhanesi” were called “Kibar koltukları” and these types of meyhane served civil servants and clerks who did not drink at their home.

There were also Ayaklı Meyhanesi for vagabonds and corner boys. These were mobile meyhane. Most of the proprietors were Armenians. These sellers would walk around Bahçekapı, Yemiş İskelesi and Galata. When they saw clients, they entered a grocery, poured the wine, which was warmed by their body heat, into a pot taken from their belt, and served it to their clients. Vagabonds and the others used fresh fruit as a meze. After drinking the wine they wiped their mouth with the back of their hands and left the grocery. This gesture was called “yumruk mezesi”.

Gedikli Meyhaneleri of Istanbul were famous for the cleanliness of their kitchen and the skills of their cook, especially in meals of fish and meat. This type of meyhane had tall ceilings. There was also a barrel that came from Malta or Aegean islands. On the tables there were candlesticks. The meze plates were put around them. The chairs were usually short and wooden. Safa meyhanesi is the only meyhanesi today that has the same interior design as the old days.

After the 1830s, Yedikule, Samatya, Kocamustafapaşa, Kumkapı, Fener, Balat, Galata, Ortaköy Arnavutköy, Tarabya, Büyükdere, Çengelköy, Üsküdar and Kadıköy became popular with their meyhane.

Until the 1850s, clients preferred wine to rakı; however in those years rakı became more popular and thus meyhane changed to a place where people drank rakı.

Cuisine 
A typical menu in a meyhane:

 Haydari
 Cacık
 Patlıcan salatası (eggplant salad)
 Semizotu with garlic yogurt sauce
 Pilaki (beans)
 White cheese
 Melon
 Seafood; octopus, shrimp, marinated sea bass
 Wine
 Rakı

References

Turkish culture
Iranian culture

Balkan culture
Types of drinking establishment